The Studio Aalto  is a house in the Tiilimäki neighbourhood of Munkkiniemi, Helsinki, which Alvar Aalto designed during 1955–56 to be the studio of his architect bureau. Due to a large number of commissions, the office needed more space in which to work. The studio is said to be one of his best buildings from the 1950s. Near the studio there is also Villa Aalto, the home (and previous office) of the Aaltos. Both the studio and the Villa are now part of the Alvar Aalto Museum, and they are open to the public. The Alvar Aalto Academy and Alvar Aalto Museum Architectural Heritage Department are housed in Studio Aalto.

Architecture
The building is designed to be used as an architect's office. It is not a conventional office building. Aalto is reported to have said that “architectural art can not be created in an office-like environment.”

The façade is built in plain style, in white-painted, lightly rendered brickwork. The closed-in mass of the building conceals a garden shaped like an amphitheatre in its inner courtyard.

The slender mass of the office wing is in white-painted, lightly rendered brickwork. From the working space upstairs, large windows give a view to both east and west.

An extension was built in 1963, with a kitchen and a dining space. These two were referred to as “the taverna”. In the courtyard there is an amphitheatre-like small space, the steps being built out of natural slate.

Alvar Aalto ran the office until his death in 1976. After that, the office continued under the leadership of Elissa Aalto until 1994. The building came into the custodianship of the Alvar Aalto Foundation in 1984 and today it houses the Alvar Aalto Foundation, the Alvar Aalto Academy and the Alvar Aalto Museum Architectural Heritage.

References

External links
Studio Aalto on the Alvar Aalto Foundation website
ISTV: Alvar Aallon ateljee avasi ovensa vierailijoille (‘Studio Aalto opened its doors to visitors’ (video))

Buildings and structures completed in 1936
Alvar Aalto buildings
Alvar Aalto Museum
Buildings and structures in Helsinki
Culture in Helsinki
Landmarks in Finland
Modernist architecture in Finland
Tourist attractions in Helsinki
Munkkiniemi